The Grozny-City Clocks, located at approximately , are near the apex of the northwest and southeast sides of the Grozny-City Towers, located in Grozny, Chechnya.  The towers opened on 5 October 2011, during the birthday celebration for Chechnyan President Ramzan Akhmadovich Kadyrov. Grozny-City Towers is a five-star skyscraper hotel, 40-storey apartment building, and business centre complex located near Grozny Central Mosque.

Technical information
Weight
 Hour hand:  each
 Minute hand:  each
 Clock movement:  each

Dials
The dials of each clock are made of "Bri-Curtain" LED arrays formed of aluminium, designed to both save weight and offer less resistance to wind.  Each set of dial markers, 12 markers per dial, is illuminated with light-emitting diodes (LED).

Hands
Each pair of hands is made of seawater-resistant aluminium, statically and dynamically balanced. Illumination is provided by white, high-power LEDs encased in black acrylic glass.

See also
 List of largest clock faces
 List of tallest buildings in Europe

References

Individual clocks
Buildings and structures in Grozny